The Party of Greens (ZÖP), or simply Greens, is a green political party in Hungary, founded in January 2006.

History
The Party of Greens was established in Szeghalom on 22 January 2006 by some rural branches of the Alliance of Green Democrats (ZDSZ) under the leadership of entrepreneur László Ács, who quit ZDSZ just before the 2006 parliamentary election. In the following weeks, other ZDSZ organizations joined the new party. ZÖP adopted its program from the ZDSZ, in which demanded the rationalization of energy management and development of agricultural techniques protecting the environment. ZÖP had 11 individual candidates and 3 county regional lists in the 2006 parliamentary election, where received 2,870 votes (0.05%). By contrast, György Droppa's ZDSZ gained only 95 votes. The ZÖP did not run in the 2009 European Parliament election and the 2010 parliamentary election.

ZÖP re-activated itself for the 2014 parliamentary election. The party was able to nominee 33 individual candidates, including former astronaut Bertalan Farkas, and a national list. Finally, the ZÖP received 18,557 votes (0.37%), alongside the Hungarian Workers' Party, the only extra-parliamentary party which obtained more votes than required proposal coupons.
The party was dissolved in 2022.

Election results

National Assembly

References

Sources

External links
Official homepage
Zöldpártok Magyarországon - Örök ígéretek

Green political parties in Hungary
Political parties established in 2006
2006 establishments in Hungary
Green conservative parties